Federal Route 500 (formerly Sabah State Route SA3) is a  federal highway in Sabah, Malaysia, connecting Kota Kinabalu to Tenom. It serves as the main highway from Kota Kinabalu to towns and villages in the Interior Division of Sabah. Federal Route 500 is one of the five highways in Sabah crossing the Crocker Range; the Tamparuli-Ranau Highway, Kimanis-Keningau Highway and Jalan Tenom-Sipitang are the other three and the new highway, Interior North–South Highway.

While the original Route SA3 is longer, only the section between Kota Kinabalu to Tenom is recommissioned as a federal highway; the section between Tenom to Paal retains its state highway code, while the remaining section from Paal to Kuala Tomani was renumbered as Route SA33 after Jalan Tenom-Sipitang was completed in 2007 and was commissioned as part of Sabah State Route SA3.

List of interchanges

See also
 Kimanis-Keningau Highway

Highways in Malaysia
Roads in Sabah